Dmytro Volodymyrovych Kotovskyi (born 8 November 2001) is a Ukrainian freestyle skier, specializing in aerials. He competed at the 2022 Winter Olympics.

Career
Kotovskyi's debut in international competitions occurred on December 1, 2017, at the European Cup stage in Ruka, Finland, where he was 32nd. He made his World Cup debut on February 23, 2019, in Minsk, Belarus. He placed 24th. As of January 2022, his best World Cup finish was 4th on January 12, 2022, in Deer Valley, United States.

Kotovskyi competed at two Junior World Championships. In 2018, he finished 20th, while in 2019 he narrowly missed the podium by finishing 4th.

His World Championships debut was at the 2021 Championships in Almaty, Kazakhstan. He was then 6th in the individual competition, finishing best among Ukrainians and 5th in the mixed team event.

In 2022, Dmytro Kotovskyi was nominated for his first Winter Games in Beijing. He finished 15th in men's competition. He was unable to compete in the mixed team event due to positive COVID-19 tests.

Kotovskyi's first World Cup podium came on 21 January 2022 when he finished 3rd in Le Relais, Canada. The next day he improved this result and clinched silver.

Personal life
Kotoskyi is student of the National University of Ukraine on Physical Education and Sport.

Career results

Winter Olympics

World Championships

World Cup

Individual podiums

Team podiums

Individual rankings

European Cup

Individual podiums

References

External links

2001 births
Living people
Sportspeople from Rivne
Ukrainian male freestyle skiers
Freestyle skiers at the 2022 Winter Olympics
Olympic freestyle skiers of Ukraine